The 2014 Tianjin Open was a professional tennis tournament played on hard courts. It was the 1st edition of the tournament, and part of the 2014 WTA Tour. It took place in Tianjin, China between 6 and 12 October 2014.

Points and prize money

Point distribution

Prize money

1 Qualifiers prize money is also the Round of 32 prize money
* per team

Singles main-draw entrants

Seeds 

 1 Rankings are as of September 29, 2014

Other entrants 

The following players received wildcards into the singles main draw:
  Liu Fangzhou
  Francesca Schiavone
  Wu Ho-ching

The following players received entry from the qualifying draw:
  Lyudmyla Kichenok
  Nadiia Kichenok
  Elizaveta Kulichkova
  Shahar Pe'er

Withdrawals
Before the tournament
  Daniela Hantuchová (left knee injury)
  Johanna Konta
  Yaroslava Shvedova
  Lesia Tsurenko
  Yanina Wickmayer (allergic infection)
  Aleksandra Wozniak
  Vera Zvonareva
During the tournament
  Romina Oprandi (viral illness)

Retirements
  Peng Shuai (exhaustion)

Doubles main-draw entrants

Seeds 

1 Rankings are as of September 29, 2014

Withdrawals
During the tournament
  Romina Oprandi (viral illness)

Champions

Singles 

 Alison Riske def.  Belinda Bencic, 6–3, 6–4

Doubles 

 Alla Kudryavtseva /  Anastasia Rodionova def.  Sorana Cîrstea /  Andreja Klepač, 6–7(6–8), 6–2, [10–8]

External links 
 

Tianjin Open
Tianjin Open
Tianjin Open